Paul Alfred Rapp (9 February 1933 – 25 July 2011) was a German economist and a regional politician. From 1975 to 1994, he was a member of the city council of the city of Mannheim. In 1996, he was awarded the Bundesverdienstkreuz am Bande.

In 1955, he began his studies in macroeconomics at the University of Heidelberg and graduated in 1958.

References

External links
Archive of the City of Mannheim 

1933 births
2011 deaths
Politicians from Mannheim
Recipients of the Cross of the Order of Merit of the Federal Republic of Germany
Christian Democratic Union of Germany politicians
German economists
Heidelberg University alumni
German city councillors